Cima di Pinadee is a mountain of the Swiss Lepontine Alps, located east of Olivone in the canton of Ticino. It lies between the Valle di Blenio and the Val di Carassino, north of the Passo di Piotta.

References

External links
 Cima di Pinadee on Hikr

Mountains of the Alps
Mountains of Switzerland
Mountains of Ticino
Lepontine Alps